Johnny A. Sanchez (born May 14, 1982) is an American stand-up comedian and actor, best known as a repertory player on MADtv from 2007 until 2009.

Career
Johnny A. Sanchez has spent many years as a stand-up comedian and is a veteran of many Los Angeles comedy clubs. He has also done voiceover work, most notably as the voice of Lombardo in Happy Feet and he reprised the role in the 2011 sequel.

He has occasionally been confused with New York City native actor/producer Johnny Sanchez, usually due to the omission of the middle initial which differentiates both artists.

MADtv
Sanchez was on MADtv from 2007 until its conclusion in 2009. He was the show's fifth Latino cast member (after Pablo Francisco, Nelson Ascencio, Jill-Michele Meleán, and Anjelah Johnson) and the first male Latino cast member hired since season six's Nelson Ascencio.

Characters
 Nacho Hernandez, also known as "Li'l Joker", a Latino thug who often appears on the news
 Farhid, an Iranian kite salesman

Impressions
 Al Pacino
 Antonio Banderas
 Carlos Bernard (as his character Tony Almeida from 24)
 Carlos Mencia
 Desi Arnaz (as Ricky Ricardo from "I Love Lucy")
 Joe Jonas
 Ozzie Guillén
 Rainn Wilson (as Rollo from "Juno")

Awards and nominations

External links
 
 Official MADtv site

1982 births
Living people
American male comedians
21st-century American comedians
American impressionists (entertainers)
American male television actors
American male actors of Mexican descent
American sketch comedians